San Marco Evangelista is a Romanesque-style, Roman Catholic church located at the end of via Laura Cereto in central Brescia, region of Lombardy, Italy.

History 
This small church was erected at the end of the 13th century as a family chapel for the Avogadro family, who owned the nearby Palazzo Avogadro. The church was damaged by a bombing raid during World War II. A frieze of earthenware arches intertwining under the cornice that goes all round the building. On the façade is a stone portal surmounted by a rounded arch; above a modern rectangular window was inserted to replace a round medieval rosette. On the right hand side of the building there is a door with a cross in high relief. The interior contains traces of frescoes and a canvas by Pietro Marone.

References 

Romanesque architecture in Brescia
13th-century Roman Catholic church buildings in Italy
Roman Catholic churches in Brescia